Vamvakofyto (Medieval Greek: Σαβίακον, Saviakon; , Saviak) is a village in the municipal unit Sidirokastro, in the northern part of Serres regional unit, Greece.

Its altitude is 120 meters.

Sources
Vamvakofyto location in (GTP) Greek Travel Pages. Online August 22, 2008.

Populated places in Serres (regional unit)